Enypia packardata, or Packard's girdle, is a species of geometrid moth in the family Geometridae. It is found in North America.

The MONA or Hodges number for Enypia packardata is 7007.

References

Further reading

External links

 

Ourapterygini
Articles created by Qbugbot
Moths described in 1906